Harry William Tampling (22 November 1896 – 10 August 1982) was an Australian rules footballer who played with Melbourne and St Kilda in the Victorian Football League (VFL).

Death
He died at Macedon, Victoria on 10 August 1982.

Notes

External links 

 
 Harry Tampling, at Demonwiki.

1896 births
1982 deaths
Australian rules footballers from Victoria (Australia)
Melbourne Football Club players
St Kilda Football Club players